David T. Howard High School was a school for African American students in Atlanta, Georgia. It has many prominent alumni. In 2018 the school was being renovated for a planned 2020 reopening as a middle school. Alumni include Martin Luther King Jr., Maynard Jackson who became Atlanta's first Black mayor, Walt Frazier who played basketball at the school, Lonnie King, Vernon Jordan, Clarence Cooper (judge), and gold medal-winning Olympian Mildred McDaniel Singleton. It is located at 551 John Wesley Dobbs Avenue. It was named for prominent businessman and philanthropist David Tobias Howard.

History

The school opened in 1923 as an Elementary School. It became a high school in 1948.

The school was named for David T. Howard, a former slave who owned Atlanta's largest black-owned undertaking business and founded its first African American owned bank. He was a noted philanthropist, particularly focused on educating children. He donated thousands of dollars to poor children to be educated, to Tuskegee University, and donated the 7.5 acre campus for the elementary school which was named after him.

Martin Luther King Jr. attended the school from 1936 until 1940.

The school building is brick. It closed in 1976.

Athletics
The school competed in the Georgia Interscholastic Association. It won the 1954 state championship in basketball.

Rebuilding
As of 2019, the former school is being rebuilt for a fall 2020 opening as a new middle school feeding into Midtown High School (Atlanta). The school will retain the Howard name, being called David T. Howard Middle School.  The renovations will cost an estimated $52 million.

Alumni
Eldrin Bell, Atlanta police chief and Clayton County Commission chair.
Clarence Cooper, judge
Walt Frazier, professional basketball star
Greg Harts, professional baseball player
Maynard Jackson
Vernon Jordan
Lonnie C. King Jr., civil rights leader
Martin Luther King Jr.
Mildred McDaniel Singleton, Olympic gold medalist high jumper
Charles Person, civil rights activist
Herman J. Russell, a real estate entrepreneur and the first African American member of the Atlanta Chamber of Commerce

Faculty
Margaret Edson, sixth-grade social studies teacher  and the 1999 winner of the Pulitzer Prize for Drama for the play Wit

References

External links 

 

1923 establishments in Georgia (U.S. state)
1976 disestablishments in Georgia (U.S. state)
Former school buildings in the United States
Educational institutions established in 1923
Educational institutions disestablished in 1976
Defunct schools in Georgia (U.S. state)
Historically black schools